CLA may refer to:

Organizations
 California Library Association, US
 Canadian Lacrosse Association
 Canadian Library Association
 Caprivi Liberation Army
 Children's Learning Adventure, an American daycare center chain
 Christian Labor Association
 CliftonLarsonAllen, American accounting firm
 Clutterers Anonymous
 College of Liberal Arts (disambiguation), multiple institutions
 Commonwealth Lawyers Association
 Communist League of America, 1928–1934
 Connecticut Library Association, US
 Copyright Licensing Agency, UK
 Country Land and Business Association, formerly the Country Landowners' Association

Science and technology
 Carry-lookahead adder, in digital logic
 Caseous lymphadenitis, an infectious disease caused by Corynebacterium pseudotuberculosis
 Codices Latini Antiquiores, a catalogue of surviving manuscripts in Latin
 Conjugated linoleic acid
 Cortical Learning Algorithm, in artificial intelligence
 Centro de Lançamento de Alcântara, a Brazilian satellite launching base

Stations
 Clandon railway station, Surrey, England, by station code
 Claremont (Amtrak station), New Hampshire, US, by Amtrak station code

People
 Brand used by Chris Lord-Alge, American mix engineer
 Cla Meredith (born 1983), former baseball player

Other uses
 CargoLogicAir, a British cargo airline
 Causal layered analysis, a futures technique
 Clã, a Portuguese band
 Clean, Lubricate, and Adjust (camera repair jargon); see Nikkormat
 Collective labour agreement
 Collegiate Learning Assessment, a US test
 Comilla Airport (IATA airport code)
 Contributor License Agreement
 County Clare, Ireland, Chapman code
 Mercedes-Benz CLA-Class, automobiles